Frischenberg is a ruined castle in Sennwald, canton of St. Gallen, Switzerland.  It was built in the early 14th century by the lords of Hohensax, probably by Ulrich III von Hohensax some time after 1313.  It was destroyed and rebuilt in 1446, and abandoned in 1551.

It is located on a rocky ridge at  elevation, overlooking the Alpine Rhine Valley.  The ruins of the older Hohensax Castle is nearby on the same ridge, at a distance of about  

The castle was sold to duke Leopold IV of Austria in 1393 along with the Hohensax lordship, but returned to Ulrich Eberhard IV of Hohensax as a fief.  In the Appenzell War of 1405, the castle was occupied by Appenzell and became detached from the lordship of Hohensax.  It was bought by Ulrich von Hohensax in 1440, but in 1446, the castle was again attacked by Appenzell, in the context of the Old Zürich War, and was destroyed.  Frischenberg was bought to Albrecht V of Hohensax in 1454. After the St. Gallerkrieg of 1489/90 it passed to the Swiss Confederacy, who gave it to Ulrich IX of Hohensax. Ulrich incorporated the lordship of Frischenberg into Sax-Forstegg in 1517.  The castle was abandoned by Ulrich Philipp von Hohensax, who built his new residence in Sax (now part of Sennwald municipality).

See also
House of Sax
 List of castles in Switzerland

References
Gustav Benjamin Schwab, Johann Jacob Hottinger: Die Schweiz in ihren Ritterburgen und Bergschlössern, Band 1. Chur 1828, S. 125f.
 H. Rudoph Inhelder: «Burg und Herrschaft Frischenberg». In: Werdenberger Jahrbuch, 5. Jhg. / 1992. Salez 1992.

Buildings and structures completed in the 14th century
Buildings and structures demolished in the 16th century
History of the canton of St. Gallen
Castles in Switzerland
Castles in the canton of St. Gallen
Ruined castles in Switzerland